A list of Brazilian films released in 2010:

2010 releases

See also
2010 in Brazil
2010 in Brazilian television
List of 2010 box office number-one films in Brazil

References

2010
Films
Brazilian